The Kacheguda–Nagercoil Weekly Express is an Express train belonging to Southern Railway zone that runs between  and  in India. It is currently being operated with 16353/16354 train numbers on a weekly basis.

Service

The 16353/Kacheguda–Nagercoil Weekly Express has an average speed of 51 km/hr and covers 1496 km in 29h 10m. The 16354/Nagercoil–Kacheguda Weekly Express has an average speed of 50 km/h and covers 1496 km in 29h 50m.

Route and halts 

The important halts of the train are:

Coach composition

The train has LHB rakes with a max speed of 160 kmph. The train consists of 20 coaches:

 1 AC II Tier
 3 AC III Tier
 8 Sleeper coaches
 1 Pantry car
 3 General Unreserved
 2 Seating cum Luggage Rake
 2 High Capacity Parcel Van

Traction

Both trains are hauled by an Erode Loco Shed-based WAP-4 electric locomotive from Kacheguda to Trichy. From Trichy, train is hauled by an Erode Loco Shed-based WDM-3D diesel locomotive until Nagercoil and vice versa.

See also 

 Kacheguda railway station
 Nagercoil railway station
 Thirukural Express

Notes

References

External links 

 16353/Kacheguda–Nagercoil Weekly Express India Rail Info
 16354/Nagercoil–Kacheguda Weekly Express India Rail Info

Transport in Hyderabad, India
Transport in Nagercoil
Express trains in India
Rail transport in Telangana
Rail transport in Andhra Pradesh
Rail transport in Tamil Nadu
Railway services introduced in 2010